Conewango may refer to:

Communities
Conewango, New York, a town in Cattaraugus County
Conewango Township, Warren County, Pennsylvania

Streams
Conewango Creek, in Pennsylvania and Western New York

See also

Conewago (disambiguation)